Elizabeth Philp (1827 – 26 November 1885) was an English singer, music educator and composer.

Philp was born in Falmouth, Cornwall, the eldest daughter of geographer James Philp. She was a protegee of Charlotte Cushman, and studied harmony with German composer Ferdinand Hiller at Cologne. She published a collection How to Sing an English Ballad including sixty songs. In London she was a neighbor and friend of Catherine Hogarth, and part of a community of musicians and writers there.

Philp died in London in 1885, aged 58 years, from liver disease.

Works
Philp composed songs and song cycles. Selected works include:
Alone (Text: James Russell Lowell)
Good night, beloved (Text: Henry Wadsworth Longfellow)
Inclusion (Text: Elizabeth Barrett Browning)
Insufficiency (Text: Elizabeth Barrett Browning)
O moonlight deep and tender (in Six Songs) (Text: James Russell Lowell)
Serenade (in Six Songs) (Text: James Russell Lowell)
Sweetest eyes (Text: Elizabeth Barrett Browning)
Tell me, the summer stars (Text: Edwin Arnold)
The sea hath its pearls (Text: Henry Wadsworth Longfellow after Heinrich Heine)
The violets of spring (Text: Elizabeth Philp after Heinrich Heine)
When all the world is young (Text: Charles Kingsley)

References

1827 births
1885 deaths
19th-century classical composers
British music educators
British women classical composers
English classical composers
People from Falmouth, Cornwall
19th-century English musicians
19th-century British composers
Women music educators
19th-century women composers